The following is a list of notable deaths in August 2014.

Entries for each day are listed alphabetically by surname. A typical entry lists information in the following sequence:
Name, age, country of citizenship and reason for notability, established cause of death, reference.

August 2014

1
Gretta Bader, 83, American portrait and bust sculptor, heart failure.
Valyantsin Byalkevich, 41, Belarusian football player and coach, aneurysm.
Godwin Chepkurgor, 45, Kenyan journalist, offered Bill Clinton dowry to marry Chelsea Clinton, injuries sustained in an elephant charge.
Chung Eun-yong, 91, South Korean policeman, instigated United States admission of role in No Gun Ri Massacre.
Norman Cornish, 94, English artist.
Rod de'Ath, 64, Welsh drummer (Rory Gallagher).
Jürgen Degenhardt, 83, German songwriter, actor, director and author, cancer.
Catherine Gregg, 96, American philanthropist and environmentalist, First Lady of New Hampshire (1953–1955), restored the Wentworth-Coolidge Mansion.
Michael Johns, 35, Australian singer-songwriter (American Idol), blood clot.
Jan Roar Leikvoll, 40, Norwegian author.
Hossein Maadani, 43, Iranian volleyball player and coach, pancreatic failure.
Charles T. Payne, 89, American soldier.
Saeed Saleh, 76, Egyptian actor (Madrast Al-Mushaghebeen).
Mike Smith, 59, British television and radio presenter (BBC Radio 1), complications from heart surgery.

2
Wolf-Dieter Ahlenfelder, 70, German Bundesliga referee.
Mariana Alarcón, 27, Argentine human rights activist.
James Anguilo, 74, Italian-American criminal.
Luciano Borgognoni, 62, Italian Olympic cyclist.
Brian Buckley, 78, Australian VFL football player (Carlton).
Chelsea Clark, 31, Canadian athlete, neuroblastoma.
Rosetta Hightower, 70, American R&B singer (The Orlons).
Ed Joyce, 81, American television executive, President of CBS News (1983–1985).
June Krauser, 88, American Hall of Fame swimmer, swimming official and rules writer, Parkinson's disease.
Eroni Kumana, 93, Solomon Islander fisherman, rescued John F. Kennedy after PT-109 sinking.
Billie Letts, 76, American novelist (Where the Heart Is), pneumonia.
Kate O'Hanlon, 83–84, British nurse.
Sir Alan Peacock, 92, British economist.
Barbara Prammer, 60, Austrian politician, Women's Affairs and Consumer Protection Minister (1997–2000), President of the National Council (since 2006), pancreatic cancer.
Sue Richards, 56, Canadian artist.
James Thompson, 49, American-born Finnish crime writer.
Pete Van Wieren, 69, American sports broadcaster (Atlanta Braves), cutaneous B-cell lymphoma.
Olga Voronets, 88, Russian mezzo-soprano folk singer.

3
Daladier Arismendi, 39, Colombian singer, stabbed.
George Ashe, 81, Canadian politician, Ontario MPP for Durham West (1977–1987), Mayor of Pickering (1973–1977), Parkinson's disease.
Miangul Aurangzeb, 86, Pakistani politician, Governor of Balochistan (1997–1999) and Khyber Pakhtunkhwa (1999).
Charles Calhoun, Jr., 83, American politician and judge, member of the Texas Senate.
Andrew Chatwood, 82, Canadian administrator and politician, heart failure.
Edward Clancy, 90, Australian Roman Catholic prelate, Archbishop of Sydney (1983–2001).
Tony Clunn, 68, British army officer and archaeologist, rediscovered Kalkriese site of Varus's defeat by Arminius.
Cec Creedon, 92, Australian politician.
Dorothy Salisbury Davis, 98, American crime fiction writer, recipient of the Grand Master Award (1985).
Kenny Drew, Jr., 56, American jazz pianist and composer.
Robert H. Ellsworth, 85, American art dealer.
Helmut Faeder, 79, German footballer (Hertha BSC, Hertha Zehlendorf).
Christian Frémont, 72, French politician, chief of staff (Nicolas Sarkozy), Representative of the French Co-Prince of Andorra (2008–2012).
Yvette Giraud, 97, French singer and actress.
Wimper Guerrero, 32, Ecuadorian footballer, heart attack.
Jess Marlow, 84, American news broadcaster (KNBC, KCBS), complications from Alzheimer's disease.
James McClure, 88, Northern Irish politician, chairman of the Democratic Unionist Party.
Richard Newman, 89, Australian cricketer.
Steve Post, 70, American radio broadcaster (WNYC), colon and lung cancer.
Charles Simeons, 92, British politician, MP for Luton (1970–1974).
David Smail, 76, British clinical psychologist.
Benedito de Ulhôa Vieira, 93, Brazilian Roman Catholic prelate, Archbishop of Uberaba (1978–1996).
Lydia Yu-Jose, 70, Filipino political scientist, non-Hodgkin lymphoma.

4
Ashraf Abbasi, 91, Pakistani politician.
James Brady, 73, American government official and gun control advocate, White House Press Secretary (1981–1989).
Hugh Calkins, 90, American lawyer and educator.
Rich Ceisler, 58, American stand-up comedian, Guillain–Barré syndrome.
Chester Crandell, 68, American politician, member of the Arizona House of Representatives (2011–2013) and Senate (since 2013), horseriding fall.
Julieka Ivanna Dhu, 22, Australian detainee, sepsis and pneumonia.
Barbara DeGenevieve, 67, American artist, cancer.
Irma Elizondo Ramírez, 68, Mexican politician, MP for Coahuila (since 2012), heart attack.
Bonar Hardie, 89, British Olympic sailor.
George Hilton, 89, American historian, heart failure.
Jake Hooker, 61, Israeli-born American pop musician (Arrows), co-writer ("I Love Rock 'n' Roll") and producer.
Erich E. Kunhardt, 65, Dominican-born American physicist.
Walter Massey, 85, Canadian actor (Arthur, Lassie, The Greatest Game Ever Played).
Rodolfo Motta, 70, Argentine football player and coach.
Rafael Santa Cruz, 53, Peruvian cajon musician and actor, heart attack.
Walter J. Sullivan, 91, American politician, member of the Massachusetts House of Representatives (1951–1953), Mayor of Cambridge, heart failure.
Peter A. Vellucci, 71–72, American politician, member of the Massachusetts House of Representatives.
Bill Wall, 83, American basketball executive.

5
Dmitri Anosov, 77, Russian mathematician.
Arvind Apte, 79, Indian cricketer, prostate cancer.
Joyce Baird, 85, Scottish medical researcher, Alzheimer's disease.
Diann Blakely, 57, American poet, lung disorder.
Elfriede Brüning, 103, German writer.
Marilyn Burns, 65, American actress (The Texas Chain Saw Massacre).
Ruth Sacks Caplin, 93, American screenwriter (Mrs. Palfrey at the Claremont), heart ailment.
Scott Ciencin, 51, American adaption novelist (Godzilla, Kim Possible, Buffy the Vampire Slayer), blood clot.
John Crawford III, 22, American murder victim, shot.
Michael A. B. Deakin, 74-75, Australian mathematician and mathematics educator.
Hans V. Engström, 65, Swedish actor (Rederiet), liver failure.
Yakov Yakovlevich Etinger, 84, Russian historian and political activist.
Harold J. Greene, 55, American military officer, Army commanding general of NSRDEC, shot.
Dave Hereora, 57, New Zealand politician, Labour Party list MP (2002–2008).
Edward Leffingwell, 72, American art critic and curator.
Khalil Morsi, 67, Egyptian actor.
Joe McManemin, 91, New Zealand athletics coach and sports administrator.
Angéla Németh, 68, Hungarian javelin thrower, Olympic (1968) and European (1969) champion.
Richard Olson, 85, American politician, Mayor of Des Moines, Iowa (1972–1979), traffic collision.
Vladimir Orlov, 77, Russian novelist.
Chapman Pincher, 100, British journalist and historian.
Rodrigo de Triano, 25, English thoroughbred, Cartier Champion Three-year-old Colt (1992), pneumonia.
Yoshiki Sasai, 52, Japanese biologist (RIKEN), apparent suicide by hanging.
Pran Kumar Sharma, 75, Indian cartoonist (Chacha Chaudhary), colon cancer.
Jesse Leonard Steinfeld, 87, American naval officer and physician, Surgeon General (1969–1973), complications from a stroke.
Ronnie Stonham, 87, British army officer and broadcasting adviser.
Emanuel Tanay, 86, American physician and Holocaust survivor, prostate cancer.

6
James L. Adams, 92, American politician, member of the Minnesota House of Representatives (1955–1974).
Ralph Bryans, 72, Northern Irish Grand Prix motorcycle racer, World Champion (1965).
Aloha Dalire, 64, American hula dancer, first Miss Aloha Hula winner (1971).
Imre Bajor, 57, Hungarian actor, brain tumor.
Ghaleb Barakat, 86, Jordanian diplomat and politician, Minister of Tourism and Antiquities (1967–1972).
Clem Comly, 59, American baseball researcher and author.
Julien Fourgeaud, 34, French entrepreneur, base jumping collision.
Brent Galloway, 70, American linguist.
Ananda W. P. Guruge, 85, Sri Lankan diplomat and academic.
John Woodland Hastings, 87, American biochemist, pioneer in antibiotics research, pulmonary fibrosis.
Macarthur Job, 88, Australian aviation writer and air safety consultant.
Norman Lane, 94, Canadian Olympic bronze medallist* sprint canoer (1948*, 1952).
Li Hu, 40, Chinese HIV activist, complications from AIDS.
Ken Lucas, 73, American professional wrestler (NWA).
Frank Shipway, 79, British conductor.
Andrey Stenin, 33, Russian photojournalist.
Smita Talwalkar, 59, Indian film actress, producer (Tu Tithe Mee) and director, ovarian cancer.
Dharmesh Tiwari, 63, Indian actor (Mahabharat), cardiac arrest.
Jimmy Walsh, 83, British footballer.
David Weidman, 93, American animation background artist (The Famous Adventures of Mr. Magoo, Wacky Races) and silkscreen artist (Mad Men).

7
Claude Bertrand, 97, Canadian neurosurgeon.
Robin Brunyee, 75, English sprinter.
Dick Collver, 78, Canadian politician.
Cristina Deutekom, 82, Dutch coloratura soprano opera singer, fall.
Víctor Fayad, 59, Argentine politician, Mayor of Mendoza (since 2007), mediastinum cancer.
Walter R. Hanson, 83, American politician, member of the Minnesota House of Representatives (1971–1982).
Mary Healy, 60, American zoo executive, CEO and director of the Sacramento Zoo, cerebral aneurysm and heart attack.
Mitsuo Higashinaka, 90, Japanese politician, member of the House of Representatives for Osaka's 2nd District (1969–2000), lung cancer.
Michael Kerrigan, 61, British television director (Doctor Who, Coronation Street).
Suruli Manohar, Indian comic actor, cancer.
Perry Moss, 88, American football coach (Montreal Alouettes, Orlando Predators) and player (Green Bay Packers), complications from a neuromuscular disease.
Alberto Pérez Zabala, 89, Spanish footballer.
Harold Poole, 70, American bodybuilder.
Syed Rahim, 85, Indian cricketer.
Henry Stone, 93, American record company executive and record producer (TK Records).
Ayman Taha, Palestinian militant and spokesman (Hamas).
Ekanath K. Thakur, 73, Indian politician and finance executive, MP for Maharashtra (2002–2008), chairman of Saraswat Bank, cancer.
Voytek, 89, Polish-born British television director and production designer.
Sir Denys Williams, 84, Barbadian judge, member and Chief Judge of the Supreme Court, Acting Governor-General (1995–1996).

8
Martin V.B. Bostetter, 86, American judge.
Luciano Bux, 78, Italian Roman Catholic prelate, Bishop of Oppido Mamertina-Palmi (2000–2011).
Edmund Collins, 83, Australian Roman Catholic prelate, Bishop of Darwin (1986–2007).
Menahem Golan, 85, Israeli director and producer (Operation Thunderbolt, The Delta Force, Masters of the Universe), recipient of the Israel Prize (1999).
Charles Keating, 72, English Emmy Award-winning actor (All My Children, Another World), lung cancer.
Viktor Kopyl, 54, Ukrainian footballer (Karpaty Lviv, Volyn Lutsk).
Leonardo Legaspi, 78, Filipino Roman Catholic prelate, Archbishop of Caceres (1983–2012), Rector of University of Santo Tomas, lung cancer.
Danny Murphy, 58, American actor (There's Something About Mary, Me, Myself & Irene), cancer.
J. J. Murphy, 86, Northern Irish actor (Mickybo and Me, Angela's Ashes, Game of Thrones).
Arthur Olsen, 100, American politician, member of the Nevada Assembly.
Simon Scott, 47, British artist and musician.
Peter Sculthorpe, 85, Australian composer (Kakadu).
Åke W. Sjöberg, 90, Swedish assyriologist.
Michael K. Smith, 48, American politician, member of the Illinois House of Representatives (1995–2011), heart attack.
Red Wilson, 85, American baseball player (Detroit Tigers).

9
J. F. Ade Ajayi, 85, Nigerian academic and historian of Africa.
Andriy Bal, 56, Ukrainian football player (Soviet national team) and coach (national team), blood clot.
Michael Brown, 18, American student, shot.
Manuel Caldeira, 87, Portuguese footballer.
Arthur G. Cohen, 84, American real estate developer (Crowne Plaza Hotel, Royalton Hotel, One Worldwide Plaza, Olympic Tower).
Mary A. Conroy, 82, American politician, hepatitis.
Jerome Ehlers, 55, Australian actor (Quigley Down Under, The Marine, The Great Raid), cancer.
Obi Henry Ezeagwuna II, Nigerian royal, traditional leader of Issele-Uku, traffic collision.
Gerhard Fischer, 98, German army officer, recipient of the Knight's Cross of the Iron Cross.
J. E. Freeman, 68, American actor (Miller's Crossing, Alien Resurrection, Wild at Heart).
Charles Gelatt, 96, American businessman and philanthropist.
Trevor Boots Harris, 69, Jamaican entertainment journalist and broadcaster, heart attack.
Wayne Ison, 90, American aircraft designer (Team Mini-Max).
Merle G. Kearns, 76, American politician, member of the Ohio House of Representatives (2001–2005) and Senate (1991–2000).
Alexander Kwapong, 87, Ghanaian academic, Vice Chancellor of the University of Ghana.
Dave Lloyd, 77, American football player (Cleveland Browns, Philadelphia Eagles).
Khayelihle Mathaba, South African royal and politician, KwaZulu-Natal MLA, chieftain of the eMacambini, traffic collision.
Yasuyuki Nakai, 60, Japanese baseball player (Yomiuri Giants), esophageal cancer.
Ed Nelson, 85, American actor (Gunsmoke, Murder, She Wrote, Peyton Place), heart failure.
George Nicholaw, 86, American radio executive (KNX).
Henry Pease, 69, Peruvian politician and political scientist, member of DCC (1992–1995) and Congress (1995–2006), cardiac arrest as a complication from cancer.
Stanley Reiter, 89, American economist.
Norris Stubbs, 65, Bahamian Olympic sprinter.
Emigdio Vasquez, 75, American muralist and pictorial artist, pneumonia.
Myrtle Young, 90, American potato chip collector, heart failure.

10
Constantin Alexandru, 60, Romanian wrestler, Olympic silver medalist (1980).
Gabriel Acosta Bendek, 83, Colombian politician, Senator (1994–2010), heart attack.
Peter Chippindale, 69, British newspaper journalist (The Guardian) and author.
Jim Command, 85, American baseball player (Philadelphia Phillies).
Graham Gedye, 85, New Zealand cricketer (national team).
Frederick Jacob Reagan Heebe, 91, American senior judge, member (since 1966) and Chief Judge (1972–1992) of the U.S. District Court for Eastern Louisiana.
John Kearney, 89, American sculptor.
Princess Lalla Fatima Zohra, 85, Moroccan royal.
Dotty Lynch, 69, American television journalist and editor (CBS News), melanoma.
Metakse, 88, Armenian poet, writer and translator.
Dame Kathleen Ollerenshaw, 101, British mathematician and politician, Lord Mayor of Manchester (1975–1976), mentor and advisor to Margaret Thatcher.
Ann Rowan, 85, Irish actress (The Riordans, Father Ted).
Shree Krishna Shrestha, 47, Nepalese actor, pneumonia.
Ima Wells, 77, American politician, member of the New Mexico House of Representatives (1993).
Bob Wiesler, 83, American baseball player (New York Yankees, Washington Senators).

11
Nadezhda Andreyeva, 55, Russian Soviet alpine skier.
Raquel Barros, 94, Chilean folklorist, fall.
Vladimir Beara, 85, Yugoslav football player (national team) and manager, Olympic silver medalist (1952).
Jean-Claude Brisville, 92, French writer, playwright, novelist and author for children.
Djalma Cavalcante, 57, Brazilian football player and coach, heart attack.
Armando Círio, 98, Italian-born Brazilian Roman Catholic prelate, Archbishop of Cascavel (1978–1995).
Martin Erler, 93-94, German philatelist.
Sir Leonard Figg, 90, British diplomat, Ambassador to Ireland (1980–1983).
Raymond Gravel, 61, Canadian Québécois Roman Catholic priest and politician, MP for Repentigny (2006–2008), lung cancer.
Morkos Hakim, 83, Egyptian Coptic Catholic hierarch, Bishop of Sohag (1982–2003).
Sam Hall, 77, American Olympic silver-medalist diver (1960), politician and mercenary, member of the Ohio House of Representatives.
Liz Holzman, 61, American animation designer, producer and director (DuckTales, Animaniacs, The Smurfs), cancer.
Reshamlal Jangade, 90, Indian politician, MP for Bilaspur (1952–1961, 1989–1991), Madhya Pradesh MLA (1950–1952).
Maibam Kunjo, 73, Indian politician.
Rolf Larsen, 79, American judge, member of the Pennsylvania Supreme Court (1978–1994), only justice ever impeached by Pennsylvania Senate, lung cancer.
Marion Milne, 79, American politician, member of the Vermont House of Representatives (1995–2001).
Stelio Nardin, 74, Italian footballer (Napoli).
Dame Julia Polak, 75, Argentinian-born British pathologist.
Pierre Ryckmans, 78, Belgian diplomat, Australian sinologist and author (Chinese Shadows), cancer.
Kika Szaszkiewiczowa, 97, Polish artist, writer and blogger.
Franca Tamantini, 82, Italian actress.
Joe Viskocil, 61, American visual effects artist (Independence Day, Star Wars, Terminator 2: Judgment Day), Oscar winner (1997), complications of liver and kidney failure.
Robin Williams, 63, American comedian and actor (Good Will Hunting, Aladdin, Mork & Mindy), Oscar winner (1998), suicide by hanging.

12
Carlos Abella y Ramallo, 80, Spanish diplomat, Ambassador to Kenya (1987–1991) and the Holy See (1996–2004).
Lauren Bacall, 89, American actress (Key Largo, The Mirror Has Two Faces, Applause), Tony winner (1970, 1981), stroke.
Purdy Crawford, 82, Canadian corporate lawyer and financier, CEO and chairman of Imasco, Allstream Inc. and Canada Trust.
Velva Darnell, 75, American country singer.
Daroji Eramma, 83-84, Indian folk singer.
Frank Eisenberg, 70, German Olympic athlete.
Samuel Olatunde Fadahunsi, 94, Nigerian civil engineer.
Jean Favier, 82, French historian, director of National Archives, president of the National Library.
Pierino Gelmini, 89, Italian Roman Catholic priest.
Javad Heyat, 89, Iranian surgeon and journalist.
Newt Hudson, 86, American politician, member of the Georgia House of Representatives (1982–2002).
Futatsuryū Jun'ichi, 64, Japanese sumo wrestler, lung cancer.
Abel Laudonio, 75, Argentine actor and boxer, Olympic bronze medalist (1960), stroke.
Gordon Mackenzie, 77, American baseball player (Kansas City Athletics) and coach.
Arlene Martel, 78, American actress (Star Trek, Hogan's Heroes, The Twilight Zone), heart attack.
Kongō Masahiro, 65, Japanese sumo wrestler, pneumonia.
Lida Moser, 93, American photographer.
Frederick Gale Ruffner, Jr., 88, American publisher.
Kazimierz Trampisz, 85, Polish Olympic footballer.

13
Hani Abbadi, Jordanian politician, member of the House of Representatives (1993–1997).
Bernard Blum, 75, French agricultural scientist, heart attack.
Steve Brook, 80, British-born Australian satirical writer.
Frans Brüggen, 79, Dutch musician.
Eduardo Campos, 49, Brazilian politician, Minister of Science and Technology (2004–2005), Governor of Pernambuco (2007–2014), 2014 presidential candidate, plane crash.
Columba Domínguez, 85, Mexican actress (Pueblerina).
Martino Finotto, 80, Italian racing driver.
Edith Flagg, 94, Romanian-born American fashion designer, pioneer in the use of polyester, natural causes.
Frank W. Hirschi, 89, American politician, member of the Idaho House of Representatives (1960–1996).
Buddy Jones, 77, American bluegrass musician.
Alan Landsburg, 81, American screenwriter, film producer (Jaws 3-D), racehorse owner and official, chairman of the California Horse Racing Board.
Fanny Morweiser, 74, German writer.
Joel J. Nobel, 79, American physician.
James J. Schiro, 68, American executive (PricewaterhouseCoopers), multiple myeloma.
Rainer Schubert, 72, German Olympic hurdler.
Dorothy Schwieder, 80, American biographer and historian, lymphoma.
Süleyman Seba, 88, Turkish football player and sport executive, president of Beşiktaş J.K., respiratory tract infection.
Jack Shallcrass, 91, New Zealand author, educator, and humanist.
Robert Bruce Smith, IV, 69, American music expert, writer, historian, and poet, traffic collision.
Terence Todman, 88, American diplomat, Ambassador to Chad, Guinea, Costa Rica, Spain, Denmark and Argentina.
Kurt Tschenscher, 85, German football referee.
Frank Udvari, 90, Canadian Hall of Fame NHL referee.
Tom Veen, 72, Dutch politician, member of the States of Gelderland (1974–1981) and Senate of the Netherlands (1979–1983).

14
Paul Aldread, 67, English footballer.
Rivka Bertisch Meir, American psychologist.
Mariana Briski, 48, Argentine actress, breast and lung cancer.
Emile Capgras, 88, Martinican politician, President of the Regional Council (1992–1998).
Pedro Caino, 58, Argentine Olympic cyclist.
Rory Chappell, 55, South African tennis player.
John Cinicola, 85, American basketball coach (Duquesne Dukes), cancer.
Madeleine Collinson, 62, Maltese actress.
Leonard Fein, 80, American Jewish activist, academic, editor (Moment), columnist (Forward) and author, founder of MAZON and Moment.
Vernon F. Gallagher, 99, American Roman Catholic priest.
Ada Haug Grythe, 79, Norwegian journalist.
Géza Gulyás, 85, Hungarian footballer (Ferencváros).
Javier Guzmán, 69, Mexican footballer (Cruz Azul, national team), diabetes.
George V. Hansen, 83, American politician, member of the U.S. House for Idaho's 2nd district (1965–1969, 1975–1985).
Stephen Lee, 58, American actor (The Negotiator, Burlesque, WarGames, Dark Angel), heart attack.
George Linton, 57, Barbadian cricketer (national team) and coach.
Rick Parashar, 50, American record producer (Pearl Jam, Temple of the Dog, Alice in Chains), blood clot.
Mervyn Susser, 92, South African activist and epidemiologist.

15
Jay Adams, 53, American skateboarder, heart attack.
Licia Albanese, 105, Italian-born American operatic soprano.
John Blake, Jr., 67, American jazz violinist, multiple myeloma.
Pierre Bussières, 81, Canadian politician.
James Cama, 56, American martial artist and teacher.
Jim Carrigan, 84, American senior judge, member of the U.S. District Court for Colorado (1979–1995) and the Colorado Supreme Court (1976–1979).
Timothy Cathcart, 20, Northern Irish rally driver, race collision.
Chen Kuei-miao, 81, Taiwanese politician, member of the Legislative Yuan (1990–1998), co-founder of the New Party.
Piet de Ruiter, 75, Dutch politician and editor, member of the House of Representatives (1971–1976).
Jan Ekier, 100, Polish pianist, composer and competition judge, Chopin authority, a winner of the Chopin Competition (1937), recipient of the Order of the White Eagle (2010).
Barbara Funkhouser, 84, American newspaper journalist and journalism academic, editor of the El Paso Times (1980–1986).
James Freeman Gilbert, 83, American geophysicist.
Robin Greene, 82, South African cricketer (Gloucestershire).
Ken Hawley, 87, British industrial historian.
Sulejman Kupusović, 63, Bosnian film director.
Jerry Lumpe, 81, American baseball player (Kansas City Athletics, Detroit Tigers, New York Yankees).
Amitava Nandy, 71, Indian politician, MP for Dum Dum (2004–2009), cancer.
Svein Nymo, 61, Norwegian violinist and composer.
Bruno Petroni, 72, Italian footballer.
Ferdinando Riva, 84, Swiss footballer.
Joseph T. Walsh, 84, American judge, member of the Delaware Supreme Court (1985–2003), cancer.
Dare Wilson, 95, British army major general (SAS), Military Cross recipient.

16
Patrick Aziza, 66, Nigerian military officer and political leader, Military Governor of Kebbi (1991–1992), cancer.
Kevin Barry, 78, New Zealand rugby union player (Thames Valley, national team).
Besim Bokshi, 83, Albanian poet, linguist and philologist.
Fannie Mae Clackum, 85, American soldier.
Bernard F. Fisher, 87, American air force officer, Medal of Honor recipient.
Liam Flood, 71, Irish bookmaker and poker player.
Adrián Gaona, 40, Mexican journalist, murdered. (death announced on this date)
David Glass, 77, Israeli politician, member of the Knesset (1977–1981).
Raul Goco, 84, Filipino jurist and diplomat, Solicitor General (1992–1996), Ambassador to Canada, pneumonia and renal failure.
Mustafa Hussein, 79, Egyptian cartoonist and journalist, cancer.
Andy MacMillan, 85, Scottish architect 
Mike Matarazzo, 48, American bodybuilder, heart problems.
Njoroge Mungai, 88, Kenyan politician, Minister for Foreign Affairs (1969–1974).
Vsevolod Nestayko, 84, Ukrainian children's writer.
Shaken Niyazbekov, 75, Kazakhstani artist, designed the national flag.
Mario Oriani-Ambrosini, 53, Italian-born South African politician, MP (since 2009), lung cancer.
Peter Scholl-Latour, 90, German newspaper and television journalist, Middle East correspondent and author.
Fernand St. Germain, 86, American politician, member of the U.S. House of Representatives for Rhode Island's 1st district (1961–1989).
Tsang Shu-ki, 64, Hong Kong economist and social activist (Meeting Point).

17
Abdullah Yeop Noordin, 74, Malaysian football player.
Emilia Castro de Barish, 98, Costa Rican diplomat.
Rosalba Rincon Castell, 79, Colombian fencing coach.
Dragoljub Čirić, 78, Serbian chess player.
Sammy Conn, 52, Scottish footballer (Airdrieonians, Falkirk), motor neurone disease.
Christian Cuch, 70, French cyclist.
Ger van Elk, 73, Dutch artist.
Michael A. Hoey, 79, British producer, director and screenwriter (Fame, Falcon Crest).
Ricardo Izurieta, 71, Chilean military officer, Army Commander-in-chief (1998–2002).
Børre Knudsen, 76, Norwegian minister and anti-abortion activist.
Pierre Lagaillarde, 83, French politician, a founder of the OAS.
Wolfgang Leonhard, 93, German historian, last living member of the Ulbricht Group.
Rebecca Lepkoff, 98, American photographer.
Marie Little, 81, Australian sport administrator.
Sophie Masloff, 96, American politician, Mayor of Pittsburgh (1988–1994).
Miodrag Pavlović, 85, Serbian poet, writer and critic.
David Russell, 75, South African Anglican prelate, Bishop of Grahamstown (1987–2004).
Nicholas Russell, 6th Earl Russell, 45, British aristocrat and disability rights campaigner, thrombosis.
Joanie Spina, 61, American magician.
Eliaba James Surur, 83, Sudanese politician.
Dick Teed, 88, American baseball player (Brooklyn Dodgers).
Pierre Vassiliu, 76, Swiss-born French singer.

18
Suzie d'Auvergne, 71, Saint Lucian barrister and jurist, High Court judge (1990–2004).
Drew Bernstein, 51, American punk, goth, fetish fashion designer and musician, suicide.
Ricardo Cabot Boix, 97, Spanish Olympic field hockey player.
Per Engebretsen, 67, Norwegian civil servant.
Gordon Faber, 83, American politician.
Sam Galbraith, 68, British politician, MP and MSP for Strathkelvin and Bearsden.
James Alexander Gordon, 78, British radio broadcaster (BBC Radio 5 Live).
Elmer Gray, 91, American baseball scout.
Lawrence N. Guarino, 92, American Air Force colonel, prisoner of war.
Hashim Khan, 100, Pakistani squash player, heart failure.
Jim Jeffords, 80, American politician, member of the U.S. House of Representatives for Vermont's at-large district (1975–1989), Senator for Vermont (1989–2007).
Levente Lengyel, 81, Hungarian chess player.
Hans-Joachim Merker, 84, German physician and anatomist.
Jean Nicolay, 76, Belgian footballer, winner of the Belgian Golden Shoe (1963).
Paul Nguyên Thanh Hoan, 74, Vietnamese Roman Catholic prelate, Bishop of Phan Thiêt (2001–2009).
Don Pardo, 96, American radio and television announcer (Saturday Night Live, Jeopardy!).
Nobuyuki Sekiyama, 80, Japanese politician, member of the House of Representatives for Niigata's 1st district (1983–1996), stomach cancer.
Doug Williams, 91, Australian footballer (Carlton).

19
Ameyo Adadevoh, 57, Nigerian physician, Ebola virus disease.
Samih al-Qasim, 75, Palestinian Druze poet and journalist, cancer.
Elaine M. Alphin, 58, American author.
Carlos Arango, 86, Colombian footballer.
Joginder Singh Bakshi, 81, Indian lieutenant general.
Mercedes Baptista, 93, Brazilian ballet dancer and choreographer, diabetes.
M. J. Bayarri, 57, Spanish statistician.
Jacques Beaulieu, 82, Canadian physicist.
Simin Behbahani, 87, Iranian writer and poet.
Manuel da Costa, 68, Portuguese Olympic equestrian.
Richard Dauenhauer, 72, American poet, historian and translator, expert on Tlingit history and language, pancreatic cancer.
Linda Dégh, 94, Hungarian-born American folklorist and academic.
Francisco García Escalero, 66, Spanish serial killer.
James Foley, 40, American photojournalist, beheading. (death reported on this date)
Yves Fortier, 100, Canadian geologist.
Sam Foster, 82, British politician, MLA for Fermanagh and South Tyrone (1998–2003).
Hayk Ghazaryan, 83, Armenian historian.
Bob Glading, 94, New Zealand golfer, winner of New Zealand Open (1946, 1947).
Brian G. Hutton, 79, American actor and director (King Creole, Kelly's Heroes, Where Eagles Dare), complications from a heart attack.
Grantland Johnson, 65, American politician.
Kåre Kolberg, 78, Norwegian composer.
Adyar K. Lakshman, 80, Indian dancer.
Geoffrey Leech, 78, British linguist.
Candida Lycett Green, 71, British author, pancreatic cancer.
Jackie Mayo, 89, American baseball player (Philadelphia Phillies).
George Munroe, 92, American basketball player (St. Louis Bombers, Boston Celtics).
Dinu Patriciu, 64, Romanian businessman and politician, liver disease.
Tom Pevsner, 87, German-born British film producer (GoldenEye, Julia).
Henry Plée, 91, French karate master.
Odessa Sathyan, 56, Indian documentary filmmaker, pancreatic cancer.
David St John Thomas, 84, English publisher and writer.
Deborah Sussman, 83, American graphic designer and artist, breast cancer.
Walter Thirring, 87, Austrian physicist.
Maruxa Vilalta, 81, Mexican playwright and theatre director.
Gershon Yankelewitz, 104, Belarusian-born American rabbi.

20
Eric Barber, 72, Irish footballer (Shelbourne).
Laurie Baymarrwangga, 96-97, Australian Aboriginal traditional owner.
Tamás Beck, 85, Hungarian politician, Minister of Trade (1988–1990).
Anton Buslov, 30, Russian blogger and magazine columnist (The New Times).
Lois Mai Chan, 80, American librarian, professor and author.
Boris Dubin, 67, Russian sociologist and translator.
Joseph J. Fauliso, 98, American politician, Lieutenant Governor of Connecticut (1980–1991).
Morteza Hosseini Fayaz, 85, Iraqi Twelver Marja'.
B. K. S. Iyengar, 95, Indian yogi, founder of Iyengar Yoga, heart attack and renal failure.
Buddy MacMaster, 89, Canadian fiddler.
Margaret Marks, 96, New Zealand cricketer.
Aiko Miyawaki, 84, Japanese sculptor, pancreatic cancer.
Rudy Ortiz, 51, Guatemalan military officer, head of the military, helicopter crash.
José Luis Saldívar, 60, Mexican football player (Monterrey) and coach (Cruz Azul), cardiac arrest.
Sava Stojkov, 89, Serbian painter.
Edmund Szoka, 86, American Roman Catholic prelate, cardinal, Archbishop of Detroit (1981–1990), President of the Pontifical Commission for Vatican City State (1997–2006).
Jan Thorstensen, 81, Norwegian Olympic alpine skier (1956).
Andrew F. Wissemann, 86, American Episcopal prelate, Bishop of Western Massachusetts.

21
Raed al Atar, c. 40, Palestinian militant (Hamas), missile strike.
Gerry Anderson, 69, British broadcaster (BBC Northern Ireland).
Helen Bamber, 89, British psychotherapist.
Don Clark, 96, English footballer (Bristol City).
Robert E. Connick, 97, American professor emeritus (UC Berkeley).
Mohammad Dabbas, 86–87, Jordanian politician, Minister of Finance (1976–1979).
Joan Erbe, 87, American artist.
Peter Handrinos, 42, American author.
Robert Hansen, 75, American convicted serial killer.
Glyn Jenkins, 87, Australian politician, member of the Victorian Legislative Council (1970–1982).
John Macklin, 66, British Hispanist.
Steven R. Nagel, 67, American astronaut, melanoma.
Jean Redpath, 77, Scottish folk singer-songwriter, cancer.
Albert Reynolds, 81, Irish politician, Taoiseach (1992–1994).
Mary Thomas, 70, American Pima politician, first female Governor of the Gila River Indian Community (1994–2000).
Verna Vels, 81, South African screenwriter and programme director.

22
Abu Mosa, Islamic State press officer, air strike.
John Fellows Akers, 79, American businessman, President (1983–1989) and CEO (1985–1993) of IBM.
U. R. Ananthamurthy, 81, Indian writer, cardiac arrest and renal failure.
Lekhraj Bachani, 85, Indian politician, member of the Rajya Sabha (2000–2006).
John Binienda, 67, American politician, member of the Massachusetts House of Representatives (since 1986), diabetes and kidney disease.
Jean Sutherland Boggs, 92, Canadian art historian, Director of the Philadelphia Museum of Art (1979–1982).
Winifred Dawson, 85, English librarian and biographer, stroke.
Sir Philip Dowson, 90, British architect.
Bohumila Grögerová, 93, Czech poet, recipient of the Magnesia Litera (2009).
Jack Harris, 91, Australian golf player.
Franz Hillenkamp, 78, German scientist.
Richard Holden, 67, American highway patrolman.
Peter Hopkirk, 83, British journalist and author (The Great Game).
Emmanuel Kriaras, 107, Greek lexicographer and philologist, heart attack.
Pete Ladygo, 86, American football player (Pittsburgh Steelers).
Noella Leduc, 80, American baseball player (AAGPBL).
Helen Mason, 99, New Zealand potter.
Nariman Mehta, 94, Indian-born American pharmacologist.
Roy Andrew Miller, 89, American linguist.
Renato Mori, 79, Italian actor and voice actor. (La Piovra)
Douglas Sang Hue, 82, Jamaican cricket umpire.
John Satterwhite, 71, American Olympic shooter (1976).
Amy Shuman, 89, American baseball player.
Adel Smith, 54, Italian Muslim activist.
John Sperling, 93, American businessman, founder of the University of Phoenix.
John S. Waugh, 85, American chemist and professor (MIT), recipient of the Irving Langmuir Award (1976) and the Wolf Prize in Chemistry (1983).
Ed Whitaker, 76, American stock car team owner.

23
Albert Ebossé Bodjongo, 24, Cameroonian footballer (Douala AC, Perak FA, JS Kabylie), head injury from projectile.
Jaime Giraldo Ángel, 84, Colombian politician and psychologist, Minister of Justice (1990–1991).
Sally Buck, 83, American baseball team part-owner (Philadelphia Phillies).
Jack Edwards, 83, Australian football player (North Melbourne).
Dursun Ali Eğribaş, 81, Turkish Olympic wrestler (1956).
Inga Juuso, 68, Norwegian singer and actress.
Annefleur Kalvenhaar, 20, Dutch cross-country cyclist, European Cyclo-cross under-23 champion (2013), race collision.
Dan Magill, 93, American college tennis coach and sports information director (Georgia Bulldogs).
Hajo Meyer, 90, German-Dutch physicist and Holocaust survivor.
William Thomson Newnham, 91, Canadian educationalist, President of Seneca College.
Adnan Omran, 57–58, Syrian general, landmine.
Ahti Pekkala, 89, Finnish politician, Speaker of the Parliament (1978–1979), Governor of Oulu Province (1986–1991).
Jindřich Pokorný, 87, Czech translator.
Marcel Rigout, 86, French politician.
Philippine de Rothschild, 80, French winemaker.
Bobo Sikorski, 87, Canadian football player (BC Lions).
Birgitta Stenberg, 82, Swedish author, illustrator and translator, hepatocellular carcinoma.
Jaume Vallcorba Plana, 64, Spanish philologist and publisher.
Elsa Wiezell, 87, Paraguayan poet.

24
Richard Attenborough, 90, English actor and director (Gandhi, The Great Escape, Jurassic Park), Oscar winner (1983).
Greg Corbett, 41, American banjo player.
Alexander Monteith Currie, 86, British university administrator.
Antônio Ermírio de Moraes, 86, Brazilian businessman, CEO of the Votorantim Group, heart failure.
Aldo Donati, 66, Italian singer, composer and television personality, cerebral hemorrhage.
Bekir Sıtkı Erdoğan, 88, Turkish poet and songwriter.
Eduard Giray, 65, German Olympic wrestler.
Noël Lajoie, 86, French cyclist.
Douglas McCain, 33, American Islamic militant (ISIS).
K. Mohan, 89, Indian film producer (Pasamalar).
Merton Sandler, 88, British chemical pathologist.
Leonid Stadnyk, 44, Ukrainian farmer, world's tallest man claimant, brain haemorrhage.
Arthur Wade, 95, Australian politician, member of the New South Wales Legislative Assembly for Newcastle (1968–1988).
Eduardo White, 50, Mozambican writer.
Enrique Zileri, 83, Peruvian publisher.

25
Maj-Briht Bergström-Walan, 89, Swedish psychologist.
Anne Borsay, 59, British medical historian.
John Brandon, 85, American actor (Dynasty, Scarface).
Csaba Csutorás, 76, Hungarian Olympic sprinter (1960, 1964).
William Greaves, 87, American documentary filmmaker (Symbiopsychotaxiplasm).
Ramón Echarren Istúriz, 84, Spanish Roman Catholic prelate, Bishop of Canarias (1978–2005).
Hildur Krog, 92, Norwegian botanist.
Martin Magga, 60, Solomon Islander politician, MP for Temotu Pele (since 2010).
Alfredo Martini, 93, Italian cyclist and coach (national team).
Marcel Masse, 78, Canadian politician, MP for Frontenac (1984–1993), MNA for Montcalm (1966–1973).
Karl Molitor, 94, Swiss alpine skier, Olympic silver and bronze medalist (1948).
Lars Mortimer, 68, Swedish comic artist.
Nico M. M. Nibbering, 76, Dutch chemist.
Carla Rotolo, 73, American folk music researcher.
Len Terry, 90, English motorsport engineer, (Lotus, BRM).
Uziah Thompson, 78, Jamaican percussionist, heart attack.
Bob Warren, 68, American basketball player.
Arthur H. White, 90, American business consultant.
John Wu Shi-zhen, 93, Chinese Roman Catholic prelate, Archbishop of Nanchang (1990–2011).

26
Christian Bourquin, 59, French politician, President of the Regional Council of Languedoc-Roussillon (since 2010), cancer.
Carlos de la Madrid Virgen, 74, Mexican politician, Governor of Colima (1991–1997).
Simon Featherstone, 56, British diplomat, High Commissioner to Malaysia (2010–2014), Ambassador to Switzerland and Liechtenstein (2004–2008).
Peter Bacon Hales, 63, American historian and photographer, traffic collision.
Caroline Kellett, 54, British fashion journalist.
Sir Douglas Morpeth, 90, British accountant.
John Joseph Nevins, 82, American Roman Catholic prelate, Bishop of Venice in Florida (1984–2007).
Jim Petrie, 82, British cartoonist (Minnie the Minx).
Chūsei Sone, 76, Japanese film director (Angel Guts: Red Classroom), pneumonia.
David E. Sorensen, 81, American Latter-day Saints leader.
Bob Wilson, 88, American basketball player.
Masakane Yonekura, 80, Japanese actor and stage director, abdominal aortic aneurysm rupture.

27
Givi Agrba, 77, Abkhazian politician.
Amadou Balaké, 70, Burkinabé singer.
Jean-François Beltramini, 66, French footballer.
Yehezkel Braun, 92, Israeli composer.
Jim Briscoe, 90, English footballer.
Al Carrell, 88, American home improvement expert and columnist, pneumonia.
Frank Corner, 94, New Zealand diplomat.
Roy Crimmins, 85, English jazz trombonist, composer and arranger.
Jacques Friedel, 93, French physicist.
Gábor Gabos, 84, Hungarian pianist.
Jan Groth, 68, Norwegian singer (Aunt Mary, Just 4 Fun), cancer.
Bobby Kinloch, 79, Scottish footballer (Hibernian).
Herbert Lottman, 87, American biographer.
Alfredo Chavez Marquez, 92, American federal judge.
Jimmy Nesbitt, 79, Northern Irish police detective, investigated Shankill Butchers.
Peret, 79, Spanish singer, guitarist and composer, lung cancer.
Valeri Petrov, 94, Bulgarian poet, screenwriter (Yo Ho Ho), playwright and translator, stroke.
Orlando Polmonari, 90, Italian Olympic gymnast (1960).
Benno Pludra, 88, German children's author.
Victor J. Stenger, 79, American physicist and author, aortic aneurysm.
Marjorie Strider, 81, American artist.
Sandy Wilson, 90, English composer and lyricist (The Boy Friend).
Xia Peisu, 91, Chinese computer scientist, academician of the Chinese Academy of Sciences.

28
Ali al-Sayyed, 29, Lebanese soldier, decapitated. (death announced on this date)
France Anglade, 72, French actress.
Margaret E. Bailey, 98, American nurse.
Joe Bethancourt, 68, American folk musician.
Pierre Brabant, 89, Canadian composer and pianist.
Yondani Butt, 69, Chinese conductor (music).
Roberto Cairo, 51, Spanish actor (Cuéntame cómo pasó), lung cancer.
Roger Clarke, 74, Jamaican politician, Minister of Agriculture (since 2012).
Glenn Cornick, 67, British bassist (Jethro Tull), heart failure.
Andrew Cray, 28, American activist and political figure, oral cancer.
Carlos Alberto Etcheverry, 81, Argentine footballer.
Hal Finney, 58, American cryptographer and programmer, amyotrophic lateral sclerosis.
Mary Featherstonhaugh Frampton, 86, British civil servant.
Hans Hoets, 93, Dutch World War II resistance fighter.
Hal Hunter, 82, American football coach (California Vulcans).
Ivan Ivančić, 76, Croatian Yugoslav Olympic shot putter (1972, 1976) and coach.
Andrew Kay, 95, American computer pioneer.
Bill Kerr, 92, South African-born Australian actor and comedian (Hancock's Half Hour).
Jack Kraft, 93, American college basketball coach (Villanova Wildcats, Rhode Island Rams).
Hans Möhr, 98, Swiss Olympic equestrian (1960, 1964).
David Murphy, 93, American CIA officer, heart failure.
Norihiro Nakajima, 64, Japanese manga artist, colorectal cancer.
Alan Reynolds, 88, British artist.
John Anthony Walker, 77, American naval officer, convicted of spying for the Soviet Union.
Fernando Zunzunegui, 70, Spanish footballer (Real Madrid).

29
Kurt Bachmann, 78, Filipino Olympic basketball player (1960).
David Bala, 67, Singaporean comedian and actor, heart disease.
Michael Banda, 84, Sri Lankan socialist activist.
Brasse Brännström, 69, Swedish actor (Fem myror är fler än fyra elefanter), heart attack.
Octavio Brunetti, 39, Argentine tango pianist.
Jesse Castete, 80, American football player.
Shamim Farooqui, 70, Indian poet.
Sir Jasper Hollom, 96, English banker, Chief Cashier of the Bank of England (1962–1966), Deputy Governor of the Bank of England (1970–1980).
George L. Little, 63, American costume designer (Apocalypse Now, Jarhead, The Hurt Locker).
Simon Akwali Okafor, 79, Nigerian Roman Catholic prelate, Bishop of Awka (1994–2010).
Ryūko Seihō, 73, Japanese sumo wrestler and actor, heart attack.
Eberhard Sengpiel, 73–74, German sound engineer.
Rosella Towne, 96, American actress (Yes My Darling Daughter).
Björn Waldegård, 70, Swedish rally driver, world champion (1979), cancer.

30
Lucien Bahuma, 57, Congolese army officer, heart attack.
Charles Bowden, 69, American writer.
Cherlynlavaughn Bradley, 62, American chemist.
Bipan Chandra, 86, Indian historian.
Igor Decraene, 18, Belgian cyclist, winner of the UCI Road World Championships – Junior men's time trial (2013), hit by train.
Shaban Demiraj, 94, Albanian albanologist and linguist.
Philippe Gurdjian, 69, French car racing promoter (French Grand Prix) and driver (24 Hours of Le Mans).
Mayumi Inaba, 64, Japanese writer, Tanizaki Prize recipient, pancreatic cancer.
Shlomo Kalo, 86, Israeli writer.
Doone Kennedy, 87, Australian politician, first female Lord Mayor of Hobart (1986–1996).
Victoria Mallory, 65, American singer and actress, pancreatic cancer.
Kirby McCauley, 72, American literary agent, renal failure.
Andrew V. McLaglen, 94, British film and television director (McLintock!, Gunsmoke, Rawhide).
Sir David Mitchell, 86, British politician, MP for Basingstoke (1964–1983) and North West Hampshire (1983–1997).
Felipe Osterling, 82, Peruvian lawyer and politician, Minister of Justice (1980–1981), Senator (1985–1992).
Jean-Pierre Perrinelle, 65, French Olympic hurdler.
Joseph E. Persico, 84, American writer.
Manuel Pertegaz, 96, Spanish fashion designer.
Bohumil Prošek, 85, Czech Olympic ice hockey player (1956).
Ann Zwinger, 89, American natural history author.

31
Abdul Alim, 83, Bangladeshi politician.
Ștefan Andrei, 83, Romanian politician, Minister of Foreign Affairs (1978–1985).
Bapu, 80, Indian film director and cartoonist, cardiac arrest.
Yves Carcelle, 66, French businessman, kidney cancer.
Bobbie Clarke, 74, British drummer, cancer.
Kenneth Clarke, Australian field hockey player.
John Crosslé, 82, English racing car manufacturer.
Stan Goldberg, 82, American comic book artist (Archie), stroke.
Josef Hrnčíř, 93, Czech conductor.
Lajos Kiss, 80, Hungarian canoer, Olympic bronze medalist (1956).
María Eugenia Llamas, 70, Mexican actress, cardiac arrest.
Viktor Radev, 77, Bulgarian Olympic basketball player (1956, 1960).
Peter Stursberg, 101, Canadian writer and broadcaster.
Carol Vadnais, 68, Canadian ice hockey player (Boston Bruins, California Golden Seals, New York Rangers), cancer.
Jonathan Williams, 71, British racing driver.

References

2014-08
 08